"Violent Crimes" is a song by American rapper Kanye West, released as the final track on his eighth studio album, Ye (2018). The song contains vocals from Ty Dolla $ign and 070 Shake, along with a voicemail message from Nicki Minaj. It was written by West, 7 Aurelius, Irv Gotti, 070 Shake, Mike Dean, Kevin Parker, Ty Dolla $ign, Malik Yusef, and Pardison Fontaine, and produced by the former three. Fontaine was revealed by West to have contributed to most of the writing and felt unhappy with him for revealing this information. The song features an R&B background and West raps about his feelings towards fathering a daughter within his verse.

"Violent Crimes" received mixed to negative reviews from music critics, with the majority of them criticizing West's rapping and mostly panning his lyricism, while its position as the closing track also faced criticism. However, some critics that generally placed less focus on West's verse expressed more positive feelings, often highlighting the inclusion of the song on the album and sometimes complementing the composition. In 2018, the song reached number 27 on the US Billboard Hot 100 and also attained top 40 positions on the Canadian Hot 100, Irish Singles Chart and ARIA Singles Chart. It was certified platinum and silver in the United States and the United Kingdom by the Recording Industry Association of America (RIAA) and British Phonographic Industry (BPI), respectively. An accompanying lyric video was released on June 19, 2018, featuring visuals reminiscent of the cover art for Ye. In January 2019, the Sunday Service Choir performed the song live, led by West. The song was later flipped within the track "Brothers", which surfaced online in July 2019.

Background and development

Along with "Violent Crimes", Ty Dolla Sign also has vocals on Ye tracks "All Mine" and "Wouldn't Leave". On June 4, 2018, three days after the album's release, Ty Dolla Sign teased a joint album with West. He recalled "going off on the backgrounds, no Auto-Tune" when working with West in a phone conversation with Rolling Stone on August 30 of that year. 070 Shake saw an increase in popularity after appearing on the track and "Ghost Town" from the album, which was recorded in 2018. When asked in a June 2018 interview with Billboard about how she felt to be a part of the track, 070 Shake was quoted as saying: Look, it feels good. I love being apart of [music with a message], no matter who it is. My goal is to be able to impact people in a positive way. So that just made the song that much better. West asked his wife Kim Kardashian to get Nicki Minaj's help with figuring out how to deliver some lines on "Violent Crimes", yet he ultimately decided on including the actual voice note itself that was received from her. Nicki Minaj revealed on Queen Radio that she was initially surprised when Ye premiered due to being unsure about how her voice note would end up being used. West had previously collaborated with Nicki Minaj on his 2010 single "Monster" that features Jay-Z, Rick Ross and Bon Iver alongside her, which he references with the lines "I hope she like Nicki, I'll make her a monster/Not havin' menages".

Co-writer Kevin Parker of Tame Impala was unaware that the track would be on the album until a friend informed him that it was being played at the listening party; Parker previously thought he was credited on "Ghost Town", not "Violent Crimes". Allegedly, Parker sent a number of samples to West for the album, though assumed that they hadn't made the cut after not hearing back from him. Prior to co-producer 7 Aurelius receiving credit on the song, he had been inactive musically since 2012. West's track "Brothers" later surfaced online in July 2019 with production included from 7 Aurelius, and the track flips "Violent Crimes".

Composition and lyrics

"Violent Crimes" is a "lullaby" that includes an R&B background. It is linked to "essentially, since he became a father to a daughter", West knowing "how to treat women better". The song begins with low-key production and long piano tones, with 070 Shake performing the intro, as well as the chorus. West's verse sees him rap about thoughts towards fathering a daughter from his position, expressing fears of her being victimized by men. The need for West to keep his daughter protected from "pimps", "monsters" and "playas" is mentioned by him. By offering ambitions as a father, West attempts to undo his years of misogyny. Ty Dolla Sign contributes softly sung vocals to the song that appear next to those of 070 Shake, prior to Nicki Minaj's outro.

Piercing the silence as the song begins to wind down, Nicki Minaj's vocals on the outro consist of a voice recording, in which she semi-speaks, paying reference to lyrics rapped by West in reference to her earlier in the song. It had been rumored for West to be shading Taylor Swift by including the voice recording, since the outro suggests that Nicki Minaj had already approved West's lyrics about her before being featured on the song. The voice recording was interpreted as shade by some because a phone conversation posted by Kardashian between West and Swift in 2016 revealed that he had Swift's approval to mention her in the single "Famous", despite Swift saying she was be blindsided by it at the time. Kelli Boyle from Elite Daily described West as shading Swift "in the most blink-and-you'll-miss-it way possible".

Writing
On September 30, 2018, West took to Twitter and revealed that co-writer Pardison Fontaine, who has the real name of Jordan Thorpe, was the person held most responsible for writing the track. In West's tweet, he recalled having "changed 2 lines", though gave credit to Pardison Fontaine for writing "the entire song". West had endured a similar process with fellow rapper Rhymefest for the writing of the former's single "Jesus Walks" (2004), though was not as vocal back then about his writing process. Due to the personal content addressed by West within "Violent Crimes", many people assumed that he wrote it, and West "ended up breaking a few hearts" by revealing that he didn't.

Around two months later in an interview with GQ, Pardison Fontaine admitted to being "pissed" that West revealed the information about songwriting when saying that nobody "needed to know I hit him about that, like, 'That's not why I do that for'". He elaborated, explaining that due to wanting to be known as an artist not just a writer, Pardison Fontaine only writes for people who have his respect, such as West because he considers him as his idol. The two became involved with each other after West tracked down Pardison Fontaine and brought him to Wyoming due to being a co-writer for fellow rapper Cardi B. West stated that lyrics of hers from the song "Drip" lead to him thinking "that's something I would have thought of and would like to say".

Pardison Fontaine claimed that Chance the Rapper recorded a "phenomenal" verse that didn't make the final song. Chance the Rapper revealed in an interview with Joe Budden that he felt he had wasted two weeks of his time working on the album.

Release and promotion
"Violent Crimes" was released on June 1, 2018, as the seventh and final track on West's eighth studio album Ye. At the album's listening party on May 31, it was the last track to be played. A lyric video was officially released for the song along with one for fellow Ye track "All Mine" on June 19, 2018. The song's lyric video features a panning view of Jackson Hole with lyrics written over it, visually resembling the official cover art for the album and the lyrics were written out in the same font used for the cover art. West used simplicity to not embellish more than he needs to. Despite not being released as a single, the song was treated as such by a video being released. Jewel Samad from Agence France-Presse (AFP) provided the thumbnail image for the visual. Though West decided on releasing the lyric videos, he had not released any music videos for Ye and his most recent music video was for 2016 single "Fade".

During the first concert of West's gospel group the Sunday Service Choir on January 6, 2019, he led the group in performing a rendition of the song. The rendition was the last song to be performed, with the performance of it beginning at 12 minutes and 19 seconds into the concert. At their second concert two weeks later, the Sunday Service Choir delivered a gospel rendition of "Violent Crimes" and were led through their performance by West again.

Critical reception
The track was met with mixed to negative reviews from music critics, with West's rap verse mostly being criticized. Christopher Hooton of The Independent wrote that it "strains to be an epic closer to an album we only started 21 minutes ago". Similarly, Meaghen Garvey of Pitchfork wrote in reference to the track being the last on Ye: "the eighth Kanye West album, out with a whimper", and opined that West's illustration of fears for his daughter are "in disturbingly specific detail". Clashs Grant Brydon branded the track as seeing West "lazily praying that his daughter be stripped of her femininity to avoid objectification". Courtney E. Smith of Refinery29 slammed "Violent Crimes" for being where West "explained his total lack of understanding about the way women see the world". Rob Sheffield, in his review for Rolling Stone, looked at the song as being a very clumsy end for the album. Hannah Giorgis of The Atlantic noted the song's "Trumpian dissonance" and described it as "Phil Collins-esque", while panning the song's "voyeuristic" tone and West's lyricism. Simon Miraudo from Student Edge wrote that "it inches uncomfortably towards racial respectability politics", which he looked at as being a possible influence from American conservative Candace Owens that West is a fan of. Miraudo continued, stating that the song "calls on the regressive idea that men can only appreciate women after they’ve sired their own". West's performance was described by Rodney Carmichael and Ann Powers in a less negative review for NPR as what shows him "reaching out to his young daughters in love, but ultimately getting distracted by the idea that other men might hurt them". In a mixed review, the song was viewed as where "with the right software you could very easily remove West's part and have a perfectly fine song" by Jordan Sargent of Spin. In The Line of Best Fit, Ross Horton pointed to the song as doing "a little bit to redeem the record", while criticizing "the recycled wordplay" despite writing that "it appears some effort went into the jazz-backed poetry on show".

However, "Violent Crimes" was positively received by some critics who were generally not as focused on the rapping. Sam Moore, writing for Metro, characterized it as a "blissful climax" to Ye and viewed the song as continuing "good vibes" on the album. Michael Saponara of Billboard ranked it as the third best track from Ye and complemented the voice recording from Nicki Minaj. Vish Khanna from NOW Magazine named the song as the best track. Jon Pareles of The New York Times described the song as "hymnlike". Tyler, the Creator revealed when speaking to GQ in August 2018 that its chords made him cry. For IOL, Mcebo Mpungose praised West's rapping, calling his verse "a warning to his daughters that Men are Trash for most men" and viewed the opening lines of it to be relatable.

Commercial performance
"Violent Crimes" managed to chart in a total of nine countries worldwide. The song performed best in the United States, entering the US Billboard Hot 100 at number 27, following the release of Ye. An entry position of number 14 was attained by the song on the US Streaming Songs chart, with 23.6 million streams being logged. On June 28, 2021, "Violent Crimes" was certified platinum by the Recording Industry Association of America (RIAA) for pushing 1,000,000 certified units in the US. By doing so, it joined "Ghost Town" as one of the two non-singles from Ye to achieve this certification in the country.

On the Canadian Hot 100, the song debuted at number 30. It also managed to reach the top 40 in Ireland and Australia, charting at number 33 and 40 on the Irish Singles Chart and the ARIA Singles Chart, respectively. The song entered at number 56 on Slovakia's Singles Digitál Top 100, while it reached a similar position of number 57 on the Portuguese Singles Chart. It debuted at number 59 on the Greece International Digital Singles chart. On November 12, 2021, "Violent Crimes" was awarded a silver certification by the British Phonographic Industry (BPI) for shelving 200,000 units in the United Kingdom.

Credits and personnel
Recording 
 Recorded at West Lake Ranch, Jackson Hole, Wyoming

Personnel

 Kanye West production, songwriter
 7 Aurelius production, songwriter
 Irv Gotti production, songwriter
 Mike Dean songwriter, engineering, mixing
 070 Shake songwriter, vocals
 Ty Dolla Sign songwriter, vocals
James Ireland songwriter
Jordan Thorpe songwriter
Kevin Parker songwriter
Malik Yusef songwriter
 Mike Snell assistant remix engineer
 Andrew Dawson engineering, programming
 Mike Malchicoff engineering
 Zack Djurich engineering
 Jess Jackson mixing
 Nicki Minaj voice

Credits adapted from Tidal.

Charts

Certifications

See also
2018 in hip hop music
Brothers (Kanye West song)

Notes

References 

2018 songs
Kanye West songs
070 Shake songs
Song recordings produced by Irv Gotti
Song recordings produced by Kanye West
Songs about parenthood
Songs written by 070 Shake
Songs written by Channel 7 (musician)
Songs written by Irv Gotti
Songs written by Kanye West
Songs written by Kevin Parker (musician)
Songs written by Malik Yusef
Songs written by Mike Dean (record producer)
Songs written by Pardison Fontaine
Songs written by Ty Dolla Sign